Rinaldo Saporiti (Milan 1840 - 1913) was an Italian painter.

He was born to an aristocratic family, and studied at the Brera Academy in Milan, where among his mentors were Giuseppe Mazzola and Luigi Bisi. He was eclectic in thematic, which included both landscapes and figures, using both oils and watercolors. In 1861, he exhibited at the Brera: Mattino and Un mercato. In 1863, he exhibited some works based on a trip to Tunisia, including Una via a Tunisi, in 1867, La Goletta-Laguna di Tunisi. He also exhibited subjects from Sardinia and Liguria. In 1870 at the Parmesan Mostra Italiana of Fine Arts, he sent three paintings representing Caneto (Lago Maggiore); The Alps; Valle di Sitsa, and a fourth watercolor: Quassa (Lago Maggiore). Also at the Exposition of Turin, in 1880, were two paintings representing la Riviera di Genoa and The Adriatic. Four years later at the same Turin exhibition, he exhibited: Caccia -nelle canne e la Pesca; and he exhibited anew, in 1886, at the Exhibition of Fine Arts in Milan.

References

19th-century Italian painters
Italian male painters
20th-century Italian painters
Italian landscape painters
1840 births
1913 deaths
Painters from Milan
Brera Academy alumni
19th-century Italian male artists
20th-century Italian male artists